Build & Burn is the second full-length album from punk rock band The Loved Ones. It was released on February 5, 2008 through Fat Wreck Chords. The album was produced by Pete Steinkopf and Bryan Keinlen from The Bouncing Souls and features cameos from The Hold Steady's Franz Nicolay and Tad Kubler. A music video was released for the song "The Bridge".

Track listing

 "Pretty Good Year" – 2:14
 "The Inquirer" – 3:31
 "The Bridge" – 3:28
 "Sarah’s Game" – 3:25
 "Brittle Heart" – 2:39
 "Selfish Masquerade" – 4:01
 "3rd Shift" – 2:54
 "Louisiana" – 3:38
 "Dear Laura" – 2:49
 "I Swear" – 4:13

Credits
 Dave Hause – vocals, guitar
 Chris Gonzalez – bass, guitar
 Mike Sneeringer – drums
 David Walsh – guitar
 Franz Nicolay – piano, Hammond B3, organ, harmonica, accordion, saw
 Tad Kubler – guitar solo on track 8
 Ericka Pfeiffer-Hause - additional vocals
 Buick Audra – additional vocals
 Pete Steinkopf – additional guitar

References 

2008 albums
Fat Wreck Chords albums
The Loved Ones (American band) albums